La fausse esclave (The False Slave) is an opéra comique in one act by Christoph Willibald Gluck. It was first performed on 8 January 1758 at the Burgtheater in Vienna. The full score is lost, but a keyboard version is extant.

Klaus Hortschansky has noted that La fausse esclave is one of Gluck's few stageworks where the composer did not use musical material from prior works, or recycle material from it into future works.

Roles

Synopsis
The story is of an intrigue undertaken to secure a father's assent to his daughter's marriage.

References

External links
"Fausse esclave, La (The False Slave)", Naxos Records, . Accessed 21 November 2020.
Work details, Bärenreiter

French-language operas
Operas by Christoph Willibald Gluck
Opéras comiques
Operas
1758 operas
Opera world premieres at the Burgtheater